Ahad Israfil (August 23, 1972 – October 18, 2019) was a man from Dayton, Ohio, known for his recovery from a gunshot injury that destroyed most of one of his cerebral hemispheres.

Injury 
In 1987, at age 14, Ahad was shot in the head at work when his employer allegedly knocked a firearm to the floor. After a five-hour operation, doctors were amazed when he attempted to speak.

The bullet destroyed brain tissue and damaged half of his skull, but the skin of his scalp survived. The void in his skull was filled in with silicone by Dr. James Apesos. Repairs to his scalp allowed the regrowth of hair, giving him a fairly normal appearance.

Life post-injury 
Ahad used a wheelchair and regained most of his faculties and successfully obtained a degree.
He appeared on television programs such as World of Pain (Bravo, UK), and Ripley's Believe it or Not.

Ahad died on October 18, 2019, while in a nursing home.

See also
 Cognitive neuropsychology
 HM (patient)
 Hemispherectomy

 Phineas Gage
 Clive Wearing

References

External links
 A news site
 

1972 births
2019 deaths
People from Dayton, Ohio
American people with disabilities
Place of death missing
American shooting survivors
People with traumatic brain injuries